Statistics of Czechoslovak First League in the 1937–38 season.

Overview
It was contested by 12 teams, and Sparta Prague won the championship. Josef Bican was the league's top scorer with 22 goals.

League standings

Results

Top goalscorers

References

Czechoslovakia League of the Whole State 1934-1938 - List of final tables (RSSSF)

Czechoslovak First League seasons
1937–38 in Czechoslovak football
Czech